Algerian Olympic and Sport Committee (IOC code: ALG) is the National Olympic Committee representing Algeria. It was created on October 18, 1963, and recognized by the International Olympic Committee on January 27, 1964.

History
On October 23, 1963, Mohand-Amokrane Maouche, president of the Algerian Football Federation is elected president of the Algerian Olympic Committee by members of the Executive Board. The International Olympic Committee recognizes the Algerian Olympic Committee on January 27, 1964, on the occasion of the 62nd session held during the IXth Winter Olympic Games in Innsbruck (Austria).

Logo

See also

External links
Official website

Algeria
Algeria at the Olympics
1963 establishments in Algeria
Olympic